Christopher C. Odom (born July 7, 1970 in Manhasset, New York), is an independent director, producer, writer, cinematographer, editor, composer and actor.

Odom holds a Bachelor of Arts in Film and Video with a Minor in Theater from Georgia State University in Atlanta, Georgia and a Professional Certificate in Screenwriting, as well as a Master of Fine Arts in Film, Television and Digital Video, from the University of California, Los Angeles.

Biography
In 2003, Odom completed the feature documentary How To Make It In Hollywood Before You Make, on which Chris worked as the producer, director, writer and editor.

Currently, Odom is writing, directing, and producing a slate of Hi-Def low-budget Faith-based features.

Influences
Odom's father, an avid movie buff, first laid down Odom's interest in movies. Odom also cites films with African American actors, as well as Spike Lee, Steven Spielberg, Akira Kurosawa, George Lucas, Orson Welles and Peter Greenaway as his influences.

Selected works
 The 23rd Psalm, Feature, Director/Writer/Cinematographer/Editor/Producer, In\-Post Production
 How To Make It In Hollywood Before You Make It, Documentary, Director/Writer/Cinematographer/Editor/Producer, Tapeworm Video Distributors
 Angel of Hate, Feature, Cinematographer, by Michael Marks

External links
 
 Interview with Christopher C. Odom by New England Film
 Review of Christopher C. Odom's documentary How To Make It In Hollywood Before You Make It at FilmThreat.com
 How To Make It In Hollywood Before You Make It Official Website
 Christopher C. Odom Official Website
 Review for HOW TO MAKE IT IN HOLLYWOOD

1970 births
Living people
American film directors
People from Manhasset, New York